= Ahmed Saeed Awan =

Ahmed Saeed Awan MNA

Member of the National Assembly of Pakistan
- In office 1988–1990

Ahmed Saeed Awan is a Pakistani politician who served as member of the National Assembly of Pakistan. He also served as a judge of Lahore High Court, being nominated to that court in 1994.
